Allegro Development Corporation is a maker of commodity management software for power and gas utilities; refiners, producers and traders of crude oil, refined products, soft commodities and agricultural commodities; and industrial energy consumers. 

Headquartered in Dallas, Texas;  Allegro has offices in Calgary, Dubai, Houston, London, Singapore, Zurich and Jakarta along with a global network of partners.

History
Allegro was founded in 1984 by Eldon Klaassen. The company was the first to develop an enterprise software platform designed specifically to manage trading, risk management, and logistics associated with physical commodities.

In 2008, Allegro received a Series A round of venture funding from North Bridge Growth and Tudor Growth Equity.  In 2014, the firm was recapitalized by Vector Capital, a private equity firm focused on investments in technology companies, and Cerium Technology Ventures, a venture capital firm founded by Allegro founder Eldon Klaassen. Immediately after the recapitalization, James Liu was appointed CEO. Allegro also acquired analytics software company Financial Engineering Associates in April 2018. 

In May 2015 Frank Brienzi was appointed CEO.  The company acquired Singapore-based agriculture commodities solution provider JustCommodity in June 2015.

In April 2019, Allegro was acquired by ION Group

Products
The company’s primary product is Allegro Horizon, an enterprise-level risk management architecture. The software is used by traders, risk managers, and decision-makers across the globe, including energy industry companies.

2013 Governance Litigation
In June 2013, Eldon Klaassen, founder and former CEO of Allegro, sued the company and directors Mick Pehl, Bob Forlenza, Patrich Simpkins, and Ray Hood for  fiduciary breach.  On October 16, 2013, Vice Chancellor J. Travis Laster handed down a 56-page memorandum opinion that said the claims asserted by Eldon Klaassen were barred because of his delay in bringing his suit.

References

Software companies based in Texas
Companies based in Dallas
Software companies established in 1984
1984 establishments in Texas
Software companies of the United States